The 2007 Clásica de Almería was the 22nd edition of the Clásica de Almería cycle race and was held on 4 March 2007. The race started in Puebla de Vícar and finished in Almería. The race was initially won by Giuseppe Muraglia, who was later disqualified for doping.

General classification

References

2007
2007 in road cycling
2007 in Spanish sport